Dolo is a department or commune of Bougouriba Province in south-western Burkina Faso. Its capital lies at the town of Dolo. According to the 1996 census the department has a total population of 8.910  .

Towns and villages
DoloBèkoroBohéroDiagnonDolindiaGoumpologoHèllèlèMilkpoNicéoNouvielganeOlbontounéSaptanSoussoubroTinkiro-Lobi

References

Departments of Burkina Faso
Bougouriba Province